The 2021–22 Saudi Second Division was the 46th season of the Saudi Second Division since its establishment in 1976. The season began on 29 September 2021 and concluded on 20 April 2022 with the final. The group stage draw was held on 8 June 2021.

The season was originally scheduled to conclude on 16 April with the final. However, it was announced that both the final and third-place play-off would be postponed due to an ongoing investigation into match-fixing allegations. The investigation was concluded on 12 April with no evidence of any match-fixing and the new date for the final was announced as 20 April.

The final was played on 20 April 2022 between Al-Arabi and Al-Qaisumah. Al-Arabi defeated Al-Qaisumah 1–0 to win their second title and first since 1986.

Overview

Changes
On 9 October 2020, the Saudi FF announced that the number of teams in the league would be increased to 32, with each group consisting of 16 teams, starting from the 2022–23 season. To prepare for these changes it was announced that only 3 teams would be promoted to the MS League and 5 teams would be relegated from the MS League in the 2021–22 season.

Team changes
A total of 28 teams are contesting the league, including 20 sides from the 2020–21 season, 4 relegated teams from the MS League, and 4 promoted teams from the 2020–21 Third Division.

The following teams have changed division since the 2020–21 season

To Second Division

Promoted from the Third Division

 Al-Saqer
 Al-Nairyah
 Al-Rayyan
 Tuwaiq

Relegated from MS League
 Al-Bukiryah
 Al-Thoqbah
 Arar
 Al-Nojoom

From Second Division
Promoted to MS League
 Al-Akhdoud
 Al-Orobah
 Al-Kholood
 Bisha

Relegated to the Third Division
 Al-Hejaz
 Al-Mujazzal
 Al-Selmiyah
 Kumait

Teams
;Group A

Group B

Foreign players
The number of foreign players was increased from 2 players per team to 3 players per team.

Players name in bold indicates the player is registered during the mid-season transfer window.

Group A

League table

Results

Group B

League table

Results

Third place play-off
Both teams that finish second in Groups A and B will face each other in a two-legged match with the winner gaining promotion to the FD League. The first leg was originally scheduled to be held on 8 April and the second leg on 14 April, however, it was both matches were postponed following an investigation into match-fixing allegations. Al-Riyadh, who finished second in Group A, faced Al-Taraji, who finished second in Group B. The first leg was played on 15 April and the second leg on 20 April. Al-Riyadh defeated Al-Taraji 3–2 on aggregate to earn promotion to the Saudi First Division League.

|}

First leg

Second leg

Final
The winners of each group will play a single-legged final on 20 April to decide the champion of the 2021–22 Second Division. As winners of Group A, Al-Arabi faced Al-Qaisumah, the winners of Group B. The match was held at Al-Arabi's home stadium due to them having more points. Al-Arabi defeated Al-Qaisumah 1–0 to win their second title and first since 1986.

Statistics

Top scorers

Hat-tricks 

Note
(H) – Home; (A) – Away

Number of teams by province

See also
 2021–22 Saudi Professional League
 2021–22 Saudi First Division League
 2021–22 Saudi Third Division

References

3
Saudi Second Division seasons